SOL S.A. Líneas Aéreas was an Argentine airline founded in 2005, and operating since August 2006 pursuant to an agreement between Transatlántica Group and the government of Santa Fe Province, who sought to improve air connections between the cities of Córdoba and Santa Fe. It had its headquarters in Rosario.

The airline filed for bankruptcy and ceased operation in January 2016. At the time of closure, the airline's fleet was made up of Saab 340 A/B and Bombardier CRJ200 aircraft.

Corporate affairs

Key people
, Horacio Gabriel Angeli held the company chief executive and president positions.

Destinations 
Sol Líneas Aéreas served the following destinations throughout its history:

Fleet
At time of shutdown:

In 2015, the airline took delivery of the first of six CRJ200 aircraft (leased from Air Nostrum) that were to enter service from October 2015.

Accidents and incidents

All 22 occupants of the aircraft, of whom 19 were passengers, perished in the accident. The cause of the accident had not been determined as of September 2011, although ice accumulation on the aircraft wings is believed to have been a factor.

See also

Transport in Argentina

References

External links

Official website
 

Defunct airlines of Argentina
Airlines established in 2005
Airlines disestablished in 2016
2016 disestablishments in Argentina
Argentine companies established in 2005